Choriolaus derhami is a species of beetle in the family Cerambycidae. It was described by Chemsak and Linsley in 1976.

References

Choriolaus
Beetles described in 1976